Boubacar Barry (born 15 April 1996) is a German professional footballer who plays as an attacking midfielder. He most recently played for Türkgücü München.

Club career
Barry joined Karlsruher SC in 2012 from SV Sandhausen. He made his 2. Bundesliga debut on 19 October 2014 against VfR Aalen replacing Park Jung-bin after 88 minutes in a 0–0 home draw. In his time at Karlsruhe, he made 34 league appearances scoring one goal.

In August 2017, Barry moved to the Werder Bremen reserves. During the 2018–19 injuries limited him to ten appearances in which scored two goals and assisted five in the fourth-tier Regionalliga Nord.

In July 2019, he agreed an extension of his contract which was due to expire in 2020 and joined 3. Liga side KFC Uerdingen 05 on loan for the 2019–20 season.

Barry moved to 3. Liga club Türkgücü München on a free transfer in September 2020. He left the club after it filed for insolvency in early 2022.

International career
Barry was born in Guinea but moved to Germany at a young age. He is a youth international for Germany.

References

External links
 

Living people
1996 births
Sportspeople from Conakry
Association football midfielders
German footballers
German people of Guinean descent
Germany youth international footballers
Karlsruher SC players
SV Werder Bremen II players
KFC Uerdingen 05 players
Türkgücü München players
2. Bundesliga players
3. Liga players
Naturalized citizens of Germany